Argens Lock is a single chamber lock on the Canal du Midi. It lies east of the small town of Argens in the Aude region of  Languedoc, France. The adjacent locks are Fonserannes Lock 53,868 metres to the east and Pechlaurier Lock 2485 metres to the west.

See also
Locks on the Canal du Midi

Locks on the Canal du Midi